Paragryllacris combusta or the striped raspy cricket is a species of cricket found in Australia.

External links
 Field Guide to Grasshoppers of Brisbane area at brisbaneinsects.com (advanced amateur site)
 Paragryllacris combusta Germar at CSIRO Entomology

Gryllacrididae
Orthoptera of Australia
Insects described in 1860